Alan Damián Pérez (born 20 April 1991) is an Argentine professional footballer who plays as a centre-back for Atlanta.

Career
Pérez came through the Boca Juniors academy, appearing twice at the 2012 U-20 Copa Libertadores. On 18 July 2012, Pérez was loaned to Boca Unidos in Primera B Nacional. He made fifty-seven appearances in two seasons with them, including for his senior debut on 10 August versus Gimnasia y Esgrima and for his first goal against Aldosivi on 19 March 2014. Three months later, Pérez joined Primera B de Chile side Magallanes on loan. He featured thirty-one times in 2014–15. In 2016, Pérez returned to Boca Unidos on permanent terms. Thirty-four matches followed, as he also received his fifth red card in six years.

On 10 July 2018, after suffering relegation from Primera B Nacional with Boca Unidos, Pérez signed for Primera B Metropolitana's Atlanta. His first appearance came in a two-goal win away from home on 21 September versus UAI Urquiza.

Career statistics
.

References

External links

1991 births
Living people
People from Lomas de Zamora
Argentine footballers
Association football defenders
Argentine expatriate footballers
Expatriate footballers in Chile
Argentine expatriate sportspeople in Chile
Primera Nacional players
Primera B de Chile players
Primera B Metropolitana players
Boca Juniors footballers
Boca Unidos footballers
Deportes Magallanes footballers
Club Atlético Atlanta footballers
Sportspeople from Buenos Aires Province